Telphusa obligata is a moth of the family Gelechiidae. It is found in Panama.

The wingspan is about 11 mm. The forewings are light ochreous with a strong rosy tint, especially on the costal and apical part and sparsely sprinkled with minute black atoms. At the basal third of the costa is a large, deep black, outwardly oblique spot, reaching beyond the fold and at apical third is a deep black costal spot. There is also a series of small black terminal dots. The base of the dorsum and a small dot on the middle of the wing near the base are black. The hindwings are light fuscous.

References

Moths described in 1914
Telphusa